Hooser is a surname. Notable people with the surname include:

 Alex Hooser
 Gary Hooser (born 1954), American politician
 William S. Hooser, American silent film actor

See also
 Hooser, Kansas
 Hoover (surname)